Stenorhopalus andina is a species of beetle in the family Cerambycidae. It was described by Cerda in 1968.

References

Beetles described in 1968
Necydalinae